Apodrepanulatrix liberaria, the New Jersey tea inchworm, is a moth in the family Geometridae. It was described by Francis Walker in 1860. It is found from extreme southern Quebec and southern Ontario southward into northern Florida and Mississippi. It is listed as endangered by state authorities in the US state of Connecticut.

The wingspan is 25–35 mm.

The larvae feed on Ceanothus americanus.

References

External links
911115 – 6693 – Apodrepanulatrix liberaria – (Walker, 1860). Moth Photographers Group. Mississippi State University. pictures of both the moth and caterpillar

Ennominae
Moths of North America
Moths described in 1860